John Montgomery Templeton  (20 May 1840 – 10 June 1908) was a Scottish Australian businessman and the author of non-forfeiture clause in life assurance policies.  Templeton was born at Kilmaurs, East Ayrshire; he was the eldest son of Hugh Templeton, a school teacher, who brought his family to Victoria, Australia at the end of 1852.

Early career
Young Templeton entered the education department as a teacher, but in 1868 became an accountant in a fire insurance office. In 1869 he formed the National Mutual Life Association, paying the first premium himself on his own life, and personally securing the first 100 members. He was made the first secretary, and having been elected a fellow of the Institute of Actuaries of Australia in 1872, as actuary to the association, made its first valuation.

In 1884 he left life assurance to become one of the three commissioners under the Public Service Act of 1883, appointed to establish the principle that promotion should depend on merit and seniority. He retired from this position in 1888, and as a public accountant was in 1890 appointed liquidator of the Premier Permanent Building Society. He also joined the board of directors of the National Mutual Life Association, and in 1896 became chairman and managing director. He held this position for the remainder of his life.

Military life
Apart from his business life Templeton had important positions in connection with the Volunteers, the militia, and the rifle clubs. He joined the Volunteers as a private when he was 19 and rose to the rank of Major. He was a first-rate rifle shot and represented Victoria in the first inter-colonial rifle match. The volunteer force was disbanded at the end of 1883 and the militia was formed. Templeton was made a Lieutenant-Colonel and a member of the Victorian Council of Defence, holding this position until December 1897. He was promoted to Colonel in 1895, and was captain of the Victorian rifle team which went to Bisley in 1897 and won the Kolapore Cup.

As senior officer from all the colonies he rode on the right of the leading section of the colonial procession at the Diamond Jubilee. He was shortly afterwards created Companion of the Order of St Michael and St George (CMG). On his return to Australia he went on the reserve of officers, but when the rifle club movement began in 1900 he was appointed to take command of it. Within a year the rifle clubs had a membership of over 20,000. Templeton gave a lecture in the town hall, Melbourne, to commemorate this movement on 29 July 1900. It was published with additions in March 1901 under the title The Consolidation of the British Empire, the Growth of Citizen Soldiership, and the Establishment of the Australian Commonwealth. He died at Melbourne on 10 June 1908. He was married twice and was survived by his widow. He had no children.

Political life
Templeton twice attempted to enter parliament. He was elected to the Victorian Legislative Assembly seat of Benalla and Yarrawonga at an 1893 by-election, and received the same number of votes as the other candidate, Thomas Kennedy. Templeton was declared the winner on the returning officer's casting vote, and Kennedy then petitioned the clerk of the Legislative Assembly against the return, citing electoral irregularities and Templeton's position in the colonial militia and as an official liquidator possibly representing an office of profit under the crown. The assembly's Committee of Elections and Qualifications found that Templeton did not hold an office of profit, but declared the election void due to the failure to provide an electoral roll to the Devenish polling booth. Montgomery and Kennedy contested the resulting by-election, which Kennedy won.

In 1903, Templeton was one of the unsuccessful candidates for the Senate at the federal election.

Legacy
His work in connexion with citizen defence was important, but his introduction of the non-forfeiture principle into life assurance policies was much more so. He had adapted the idea from somewhat similar principles that had been made law in the state of Massachusetts, United States of America, in 1861. Templeton, however, in 1869 introduced a clause in the policies of the newly formed National Mutual Life Association which provided that overdue premiums would automatically be advanced against the surrender value until the surrender value was exhausted. The principle was adopted by other companies, and has proved of the greatest benefit to an immense number of people.

References

1840 births
1908 deaths
Companions of the Order of St Michael and St George
British emigrants to Australia
Members of the Victorian Legislative Assembly
19th-century Australian businesspeople